Salama is a steel roller coaster located at Linnanmäki in Helsinki, Finland. It was constructed for the 2008 season. It is built on top of Hurjakuru, a river rafting ride.

Salama got its name from Kalevala, the national epic of Finland.

External links
Salama at Linnanmäki official website

Roller coasters in Finland
Linnanmäki